Faimes is a municipality of Wallonia located in the province of Liège, Belgium. 

On January 1, 2006, Faimes had a total population of 3,468.

The municipality consists of the following districts: Aineffe, Borlez, Celles, Les Waleffes, and Viemme. The eponymous Faimes is a hamlet within Celles.

Image gallery

See also
 List of protected heritage sites in Faimes

References

External links
 

Municipalities of Liège Province